Senično (in older sources also Stenično) is a village in the Municipality of Tržič in the Upper Carniola region of Slovenia.

The local church is dedicated to Saint Bartholomew and dates from the 14th century with well-preserved late 15th-century frescos on the walls and ceiling of the sanctuary. The church lies inside a walled enclosure with a portal dated 1738.

References

External links
Senično at Geopedia

Populated places in the Municipality of Tržič